The Women's K-2 500m event at the 2010 South American Games was held March 28, 2010 at 10:00.

Medalists

Results

References
Final

500m K-2 Women